The Minnesota Senate, District 2, encompasses the North-Central part of Minnesota. It stretches from Lake of the Woods County south to the White Earth Indian Reservation. It includes all or portions of Becker, Beltrami, Clearwater, Hubbard, Lake of the Woods, Mahnomen, Otter Tail and Wadena counties.  It is currently represented by Republican Paul Utke.

List of senators

References 

The Minnesota Legislative Manual, 1911. Minnesota Secretary of State. 1911. 493.

Minnesota Senate districts
Lake of the Woods County, Minnesota
Becker County, Minnesota
Otter Tail County, Minnesota
Beltrami County, Minnesota
Clearwater County, Minnesota
Hubbard County, Minnesota
Mahnomen County, Minnesota
Wadena County, Minnesota